Halcyondale is an unincorporated community in Screven County, in the U.S. state of Georgia.

History
A post office was established at Halcyondale in 1842, and remained in operation until 1957. The name Halcyondale is a coined one meaning "peaceful valley".

References

Unincorporated communities in Screven County, Georgia
Unincorporated communities in Georgia (U.S. state)